"Gillis Mountain" is a song recorded by Canadian music group The Rankin Family. It was released in 1993 as the third single from their second studio album, Fare Thee Well Love. It peaked in the top 10 on the RPM Country Tracks and Adult Contemporary Tracks charts. The song is a reference to Gillis Mountain, a 166-meter mountain in Cape Breton.

Chart performance

Year-end charts

References

1990 songs
1993 singles
The Rankin Family songs
Capitol Records singles